Karayev or Karaev is a masculine surname, its feminine counterpart is Karayeva or Karaeva. It may refer to
Alan Karaev (born 1977), Russian sumo wrestler
David Karayev (born 1995), Russian football midfielder
Dzhuma Durdy Karayev (1910–1960), Turkmen politician
Kara Karayev (1918–1982), Azerbaijani composer
Ruslan Karaev (born 1983), Russian-Ossetian kickboxer 
Vitaly Karayev (1962–2008), Russian politician

See also
Garayev